The Bowerman is an annual track and field award that is the highest accolade given to the year's best student-athlete in American collegiate track and field. It is named after Oregon track and field and cross country coach Bill Bowerman and is administered by the U.S. Track & Field and Cross Country Coaches Association (USTFCCCA).  

The winners of the award are announced in a mid-December ceremony held in conjunction with the USTFCCCA annual convention.

List of recipients

References

External links
Official website

Sport of athletics awards
College sports trophies and awards in the United States
Most valuable player awards
Awards established in 2009